Ban Luang is a tambon (subdistrict) of Mae Ai District, in Chiang Mai Province, Thailand. In 2020 it had a total population of 7,680 people.

History
The subdistrict was created effective July 1, 1980 by splitting off 5 administrative villages from San Ton Mue.

Administration

Central administration
The tambon is subdivided into 10 administrative villages (muban).

Local administration
The whole area of the subdistrict is covered by the subdistrict administrative organization (SAO) Ban Luang (องค์การบริหารส่วนตำบลบ้านหลวง).

References

External links
Thaitambon.com on Ban Luang

Tambon of Chiang Mai province
Populated places in Chiang Mai province